Slack is an instant messaging program designed by Slack Technologies and owned by Salesforce. Although Slack was developed for professional and organizational communications, it has also been adopted as a community platform. Users can communicate with voice calls, video calls, text messaging, media, and files in private chats or as part of communities called "workspaces." Slack also uses IRC-style features such as persistent chat rooms (channels) organized by topic, private groups, and direct messaging. In addition to these online communication features, Slack can integrate with other software. Slack runs on Windows, Linux, MacOS, Android, Windows Phone and iOS.

History
Slack began as an internal tool for Stewart Butterfield's company, Tiny Speck, during the development of Glitch, an online game. Slack launched to the public in August 2013.

According to Butterfield, "Slack" is an acronym for "Searchable Log of All Conversation and Knowledge," which he chose in 2012 to replace the previous codename, "linefeed."

Slack was previously compatible with non-proprietary Internet Relay Chat (IRC) and XMPP messaging protocols, but the company closed the corresponding gateways in May 2018.

On July 26, 2018, Atlassian announced the shutdown of its competing HipChat and Stride, effective February 11, 2019, and the sale of its intellectual property to Slack. The companies also announced a commitment to work on integrating Slack with Atlassian services.

In June 2019, Slack went public through a direct public offering to reach a market value of US$19.5 billion.

In July 2020, Slack acquired Rimeto; a startup company focused on directory building. This acquisition was to provide additional search offerings for employees within a Slack workspace.

On January 1, 2021, Slack and Salesforce announced an agreement for Salesforce to acquire the company for a value of approximately $27.7 billion. The acquisition closed on July 21, 2021.

On December 5, 2022, Salesforce announced that Stewart Butterfield was leaving Slack, and he would be succeeded by Lidiane Jones, an executive vice president at Salesforce.

Incidents

In March 2015, Slack announced it had been hacked for over four days in February 2015 and that some data associated with user accounts had been compromised, including email addresses, usernames, hashed passwords, phone numbers, and Skype IDs. In response to the attacks, Slack added two-factor authentication to its service.

On January 4, 2021, Slack suffered a significant outage that lasted several hours. From 10 AM ET until 3 PM ET, users could not log in, send or receive messages, place or answer calls, or use Slack connections. After 3 PM, most of the core features became operational, except for push notifications, email, and third-party integrations including Google Calendar and Outlook Calendar.

In 2022, Slack suffered widely reported outages on February 22, March 9, July 26.

On 31 December 2022, Slack announced that its private GitHub repositories had been compromised during previous weeks, using stolen security tokens.

Features
Slack offers many IRC-style features, including persistent chat rooms (channels) organized by topic, private groups, and direct messaging. Content, including files, conversations, and people, is all searchable within Slack. Users can add emoji buttons to their messages, which other users can then click to express their reactions to messages. Slack's free plan limits users to viewing and searching only the most recent 10,000 messages. In March 2020, Slack redesigned its platform in an attempt to further simplify the user experience.

Teams
Slack teams allow communities, groups, or teams to join a "workspace" via a specific URL or invitation sent by a team admin or owner. Although Slack was developed for professional and organizational communications, it has been adopted as a social-community platform.

Messaging
Public channels allow team members to communicate without the use of email or group SMS (texting). Public channels are discoverable by everyone in the workspace. Public channels can be converted into private channels.

Private channels allow for private conversation between smaller sub-groups. These private channels can be used to organize large teams. Private channels cannot be converted into public channels.

Direct messages allow users to send private messages to specific users rather than a group of people. Direct messages can include up to nine people. Once created, a group DM can be converted into a private channel.

Huddles 
In March 2022, Slack announced Huddles, "a lightweight audio-first way to start live conversations," which TNW described as "effectively a Clubhouse clone" after it was first launched in 2021. Huddles are limited to only two participants on free tiers or 50 on paid plans. Once in a huddle, users can mute/unmute themselves, share their screens, draw on a shared screen, and invite others to the huddle. If a user is alone in a huddle, the app will automatically play various smooth jazz to alert the user they remain in the huddle.

Integrations
Slack integrates with many third-party services and supports community-built integrations, including Google Drive, Trello, Dropbox, Box, Heroku, IBM Bluemix, Crashlytics, GitHub, Runscope, Zendesk, and Zapier. In July 2015, Slack launched an integration with Google Calendar. In December of that year, Slack launched their software application ("app") directory, consisting of over 150 integrations that users can install.

In March 2018, Slack announced a partnership with a financial and human capital management firm Workday. This integration allows Workday customers to access Workday features directly from the Slack interface.

API
Slack provides an application programming interface (API) for users to create applications and automate processes, such as sending automatic notifications based on human input, sending alerts on specified conditions, and automatically creating internal support tickets. Slack's API is compatible with many types of applications, frameworks, and services.

Slackbot 
Slack allows users to add and customize chatbots, which can send notifications or reminders, provide custom responses to specific phrases, etc.

Platforms
Slack provides mobile apps for iOS and Android in addition to their Web browser client and desktop clients for MacOS, Windows, and Linux (beta). Slack is also available for the Apple Watch, allowing users to send direct messages, see mentions, and make simple replies. Slack has been made to run on a Super Nintendo Entertainment System via Satellaview.

Business model
Slack is a freemium product whose main paid features are the ability to search more than 10,000 archived messages and add unlimited apps and integrations. They also claim support for an unlimited number of users. When FreeCodeCamp attempted to switch its community of over 8,000 users to Slack in 2015, however, they experienced many technical issues and were advised by Slack support to limit their channels to "no more than 1,000 users (ideally more like 500)." That specific limit no longer applied by January 2017.

Growth 
In August 2013, 8,000 customers signed up for the service within 24 hours of its launch. In February 2015, the company reported that approximately 10,000 new daily active users had signed up each week, and had more than 135,000 paying customers spread across 60,000 teams. By April 2015, those numbers had grown to 200,000 paid subscribers and a total of 750,000 daily active users. Late in 2015, Slack passed more than a million daily active users. , Slack had over 8 million daily users, 3 million of whom had paid accounts. At the time of its S-1 filing for IPO, dated April 26, 2019, Slack reported more than 10 million daily active users from more than 600,000 organizations, located in more than 150 countries.

In 2019, it was estimated that employees at large firms were sending over 200 Slack messages per week on average. From 2013 to 2019 the amount of time spent on work email had declined, which was attributed to the proliferation of Slack and its competitors Workplace (launched by Facebook in 2016), Microsoft Teams (launched 2017) and Google Hangouts Chat and Meet (launched in 2018).

Reception
In March 2015, the Financial Times wrote that Slack was the first business technology to have crossed from business into personal use since Microsoft Office and the BlackBerry. In 2017, New York magazine criticized the platform for being "another utility we both rely on and resent."

In 2017, Slack was recognized as the best startup of the year at the Crunchies Awards, organized by TechCrunch.

The digital rights group Electronic Frontier Foundation (EFF) has cautioned that "Slack stores and is able to read all of your communications, as well as identifying information for everyone in your workspace." They commended the company for "follow[ing] several best practices in standing up for users" concerning government data requests, such as requiring a warrant for content stored on its server, and awarding it four out of five stars in its 2017 "Who has your back" report; the EFF also criticized Slack for "a broad set of exceptions" to its promise to notify users of such requests, and for other privacy shortcomings.

Slack has been criticized by users for storing user data exclusively on cloud servers under Slack control. This is found to be a particular issue for users with large teams, who experienced issues with connectivity within the app, access to archived messages, and the number of users for a given "workspace."

Slack has also been criticized for a retroactive 2018 change to its privacy policy, allowing access to all public and private chat messages by workspace administrators, without the need of consent from any parties using the app. According to the new policy, Slack workspace members are no longer notified when data is downloaded from their workspace.

Slack has also been criticized when used in free and open source projects for the inability to search for messages and discussions. With a traditional mailing list, one can use any search engine to find discussions of problems and issues. However, Slack channels are not indexed by search engines, so they cannot be searched using traditional tools.

See also
 List of collaborative software

References

External links
 
 
 Slack as a Social Media Tool

2013 software
Android (operating system) software
Collaborative software
IOS software
Linux software
MacOS software
Project management software
Task management software
Windows Phone software
Windows software
Groupware
Business chat software